Elachista arnoldi is a moth of the family Elachistidae that can be found in the Netherlands and Germany.

The larvae probably feed on Carex. They mine the leaves of their host plant.

References

arnoldi
Moths described in 1993
Moths of Europe